Michel Mouillot is a former French politician. He used to be mayor of the town of Cannes until 1996 arrest and criminal conviction of corruption with subsequent imprisonment.

References

Bibliography 
 Un complot en Provence, Ed. Laurens, Paris, 1998
 Tous mouillés, Ed. Michel Lafon, Paris, 2004

Politicians of the French Fifth Republic
Living people
Year of birth missing (living people)
20th-century French politicians